Arkhangelskoye is a rural locality (a selo) and the administrative center of Arkhangelskoye Rural Settlement, Starooskolsky District, Belgorod Oblast, Russia. The population was 963 as of 2010. There are 21 streets.

Geography 
Arkhangelskoye is located 24 km southeast of Stary Oskol (the district's administrative centre) by road. Khoroshilovo is the nearest rural locality.

References 

Rural localities in Starooskolsky District